Stephen Raoul Jones (born 23 January 1951) is an Australian video artist, writer and curator.  Born in Sydney, Australia, Jones, together with Tom Ellard, was a principal member of Severed Heads from 1982 to 1992.  He developed analog video synthesizers for the production of video art and for use in Severed Heads' live performances and music videos.

Jones has created many video art and documentation works since 1975. Hunting For the Future (1977) is a documentation of Nam June Paik and Charlotte Moorman's Art Gallery of NSW visit in 1976 – it is now housed in the collections of the Art Gallery of NSW and the Queensland Art Gallery, as well as included in Tell Me, Tell Me, an MCA Offsite exhibition that toured South Korea in 2011. Jones and Warren Burt created Three Texts in 1977 at La Trobe University. His Stonehenge, TV Buddha and Tai Chi Transforms (The Systems Interfacing Reports) work (1976-'78) is included in the National Gallery of Australia.

Jones has also worked as a video post-production engineer. In 1996, he received the New Media Arts Fellowship to work on The Brain Project – a website dedicated to the science of consciousness. In 2007 he received a PhD studying the history of the electronic arts in Australia to 1975. Jones also maintains a private archive documenting artworks and exhibitions of art and technology based artists.

In 2013, Jones was guest curator for Artspace's 'This is Video exhibition as part of ISEA 2013. The exhibition revisited the 1981 exhibition Video Art from Australia which had been presented in Venice and subsequently toured through Australia.

Jones' book Synthetics: Aspects of Art and Technology in Australia, 1956 – 1975 was published by MIT Press in their Leonardo Book Series. Scanlines said the book has become the definitive work in the field in Australia.

References

External links
 Synthetics - A History of Video Art in Australia

1951 births
Living people
Severed Heads members
Australian video artists